Thông Nông is a township of Hà Quảng District, Cao Bằng Province.

The township was the district capital of former Thông Nông District.

References

Populated places in Cao Bằng province
Townships in Vietnam